Early Soundtrack Sketches, Vol. I is the second studio album of Daniel Vahnke, released on August 1, 2018 by Rodentia Productions.

Track listing

Personnel
Adapted from the Early Soundtrack Sketches, Vol. I liner notes.

Axon Tremolo
 Daniel Vahnke – sampler, piano

Production
 Neil Wojewodzki – mastering, editing

Release history

References

External links 
 Early Soundtrack Sketches, Vol. I at Discogs (list of releases)
 Early Soundtrack Sketches, Vol. I at Bandcamp
 Early Soundtrack Sketches, Vol. I at iTunes

2018 albums
Daniel Vahnke albums